The Brewery is a shopping and leisure centre in Romford town centre, in the London Borough of Havering, England. It is located on the site of the former Star Brewery, and it opened in 2001. It is—along with The Liberty and The Mercury—one of the three main shopping centres in Romford.

In 2010, a 25% stake in the complex was sold by the Henderson Group to Prudential Property Investment Managers for £44.25m. At the time of the sale, its location in east London, mix of retail and leisure uses, and the Sainsbury's anchor store were explained as factors for its sustained success during the late-2000s recession.

Leisure uses in the centre include a bowling and amusement arcade unit, a cinema, and a number of restaurants. The Brewery is located within Romford's town centre and is near to Romford railway station. A number of London Buses serve the centre and route 165 terminates within The Brewery car park.

References

External links

Shopping centres in the London Borough of Havering
Tourist attractions in the London Borough of Havering
Shopping malls established in 2001
Romford